William James West, was an English surgeon and apothecary, who among other things took a prominent role in the local movement of reform of medical practice. He published in 1837 the first article referred to an ovariectomy performed in England and first described the picture of a kind of infantile spasm (present in his own son, James Edwin West) in an article published by The Lancet in 1841. Today, this syndrome is typically characterized by three findings: epileptic spasms, psychomotor retardation and electroencephalogram with a characteristic layout of hypsarrhythmia, although one of the three may not appear.

Biography 

There is little that is known about William James West, and the data about him, especially in the early years, are contradictory. Depending on the source his birth is dated in 1793 or 1794 in England, although the exact location is unknown. It is believed that he received medical training at Guy's Hospital in London, and it is known that he was admitted to the Royal College of Surgeons in February 1815.

West married Mary Halsey Dashwood in June 1828 in the St Giles' Church, district of Camberwell, London. Although neither William nor Mary were originally from Kent, they lived in Tonbridge, a small town in that county. A year after his marriage his first daughter, Julia, was born. In 1834 or 1835 a son, William, was born. His third child, James Edwin, who was the object of the description of the syndrome that bears his name, was born on 13 February 1840.

West was working quite successfully as a general practitioner and surgeon in Tonbridge. In 1837 West published in The Lancet a description of the first ovariectomy, describing how he removed an ovarian cyst with a size of about 20 pints (11.3 liters ). The patient recovered well, and the cyst was placed on display at the Museum of Guy's Hospital. His colleague and friend, John Gorham published later about several of the ovariotomies performed by West.

In late January 1841 William wrote to The Lancet describing the case of his son James, who began to suffer a seizure disorder at four months of age. West's letter was published by The Lancet on 13 February 1841, James' first birthday.

William James West died in 1848 at approximately 55 years of age, as recorded in the annals of Tonbridge, because of dropsy, an older term used to designate the ascites resulting from kidney or heart failure. His grave can still be visited in the cemetery of the St. Peter and St. Paul's Church in Tonbridge.

Five years after the death of his father in 1853, James was transferred to the Earlwood Asylum for the Feeble-Minded in Redhill. James died on 27 September 1860, at the age of 20 and was buried in the same grave as his father.

Legacy 

The name of William West is best known for the eponymous syndrome, even though the convention on the use of this name is relatively recent and dates back to 1960, when H. Gastaut organized the 9th Colloque de Marseille (Marseille Colloquium); which focused on infantile spasms. The methods of this meeting were published in the book L'encéphalopathie Myoclonique Infantile avec Hypsarythmie (infantile myoclonic encephalopathy with hypsarrhythmia) and was at that conference that H. Gastaut suggested the use of West syndrome as an eponym for infantile spasms; which is widely used for the syndrome to date.

The truth is that most of the legacy of William and James West would have been lost forever if Mary West had not donated, some six months after the death of her husband, her private journal to William Newnham, a physician from Farnham. Newnham had found a similar case described by West two years before the publication of the case of James in The Lancet, so Mary's journal apparently aroused great interest in Newnham. A couple of years later Newnham wrote a monograph describing four cases, one of which was that of James West; Newnham's monograph quoted directly from Mary West's journal, and it is thanks to this work and the William West's letter to The Lancet, that some scant information has been retained about the private life and history of William and James West.

See also 
 West syndrome

References 

1848 deaths
British surgeons
Fellows of the Royal College of Surgeons